Hocheiser (3,206m) is a mountain in the Glockner Group of the High Tauern in the state of Salzburg, Austria.

Located between the Stubach and Kaprun valleys, Hocheiser is an impressive sight from the west. It is usually climbed from the Stubach side and provides excellent views of nearby mountains such as Großglockner, Grossvenediger and Grosses Wiesbachhorn from its summit.

References

Mountains of Salzburg (state)
Mountains of the Alps
Glockner Group
Alpine three-thousanders